Theodore von Kármán was a Hungarian-American mathematician, aerospace engineer and physicist.

Von Kármán may also refer to:

 Von Kármán (lunar crater)
 Von Kármán (Martian crater)
 Von Karman Institute for Fluid Dynamics
 Von Kármán ogive
 Von Kármán constant
 von Kármán Wind Turbulence Model
 Theodore von Karman Medal

See also
 Born–von Karman boundary condition
 Karman, surname